Kadaka (Estonian for "Juniper") is a subdistrict in the district of Mustamäe, Tallinn, the capital of Estonia. It has a population of 4,817.

Gallery

References

Subdistricts of Tallinn